Wu Chung-chou (born 1 August 1956) is a Taiwanese bobsledder. He competed in the two man and the four man events at the 1984 Winter Olympics.

References

1956 births
Living people
Taiwanese male bobsledders
Olympic bobsledders of Taiwan
Bobsledders at the 1984 Winter Olympics
People from Hsinchu
20th-century Taiwanese people